This is a list of Erie Railroad structures documented by the Historic American Engineering Record.

Structures

References

External links

HAER
List
List
List
X
.
.
 
Erie Railroad
Erie Railroad
Erie Railroad
Erie Railroad
Erie Railroad
Erie Railroad
Erie Railroad
Erie Railroad